Bugotak Hills are a series of hills in Toguchinsky District of Novosibirsk Oblast, Russia. The hills are a natural monument of regional significance with an area of 701.0 hectares.

Location
The Bugotak Hills are located within the Kolyvan–Tomsk folded zone in the east of Novosibirsk Oblast, the ridge of hills is an S-shaped line 100 km long, which extends from northeast to southwest.

Hills (from northeast to southwest)
 Bolshaya (362 m), there is a ski track on the northern slope.
 Mokhnataya (375 m), there is a radio station building on the top of the hill.
 Konstantinovskaya, it is located between Mokhnataya and Lysaya hills.
 Lysaya (352 m), an Orthodox cross is situated on the top of the hill.
 Kholodnaya, previously, the hill had a height of 381 m and was the highest hill in this region. There is a quarry for the extraction of building materials on the top of the hill.
 A small unnamed hill is located south-west of Lysaya and Kholodnaya hills.
 Rogachyov Hill (323 m)
 Potapov Hill (232 m)
 Zonov Hill, it is located near Ulantova Mountain.

External links
 Новосибирская область. Буготакские сопки. Russian Geographical Society.

Hills of Russia
Landforms of Novosibirsk Oblast